This list of tallest buildings in North Macedonia ranks buildings in North Macedonia by official height. Currently, the tallest buildings in North Macedonia are the Cevahir Towers, four buildings each rising .

Tallest buildings in North Macedonia
This list ranks North Macedonia's tallest buildings.

Clock towers

References

External links
Diagram of Macedonia Buildings on SkyscraperPage
Macedonia page on Emporis.com

Tallest
North Macedonia
North Macedonia